Viktor Valeriyovych Halasiuk (born 28 August 1981) is a Ukrainian economist and politician, Member of the Parliament of Ukraine since 27 November 2014, Deputy Leader of the Radical Party of Ukraine on Economic Policy, President of the Ukrainian Association for the Club of Rome, Member of National Reform Council, and Honorable President of the Ukrainian Association for Innovation Development (UAID)

Personal life
Viktor Halasiuk (or Viktor Halasyuk) was born on 28 August 1981 in Dnipropetrovsk, Ukrainian SSR. He is married.

Career
Halasiuk appeared tenth on the party list of the Radical Party, Halasiuk was elected to the Verkhovna Rada in the 2014 Ukrainian parliamentary election.

References

1981 births
Living people
People from Dnipro
21st-century Ukrainian economists
Eighth convocation members of the Verkhovna Rada
Radical Party of Oleh Liashko politicians
Dnipro Polytechnic alumni